Stocking is a surname. Notable people with the surname include:

Barbara Stocking (born 1951), British civil servant
Dave Stocking, British Trotskyist
George W. Stocking Sr. (1892–1975), American economist
George W. Stocking Jr. (1928–2013), American anthropologist
Hannah Stocking (born 1992), American internet personality